The following is a list of Tennessee Volunteers head basketball coaches. The Volunteers have had 21 coaches in their 109-season history. 

 An asterisk (*) denotes a season currently in progress.
^ – Tennessee didn't field a team in the 1943–44 season.

References

Tennessee

Tennessee Volunteers basketball coaches